Dudley Area was a branch line off the main Wonthaggi line in Victoria, Australia, built to serve a section of the State Coal Mine in the area. The branch was not opened with the original line, but was in operation by 1930. By 1970 the line had been closed and dismantled.

Closed regional railway lines in Victoria (Australia)
Transport in Gippsland (region)
Bass Coast Shire